Khoshk Lat (also Romanized as Khoshk Lāt; also known as Khoshkeh Lāt and Khoshken Lāt) is a village in Siahkalrud Rural District, Chaboksar District, Rudsar County, Gilan Province, Iran. During the 2006 census, its population was 330, in 105 families.

References 

Populated places in Rudsar County